Cherry Peel is the debut album of the Elephant 6 band Of Montreal.  It was released on Bar/None Records in 1997.  In 1999 it was reissued with additional musical contributions and the songs remixed.  All subsequent reissues contain this mix.  All songs were written by Kevin Barnes.

Track listing

Credits 
 Derek Almstead - drums, vocals
 Bryan Poole - bass, guitar, vocals
 Kevin Barnes - guitar, vocals

References 

1997 debut albums
Of Montreal albums
Bar/None Records albums